North Freeway may refer to:
North Freeway (Fort Worth, Texas), a section of Interstate 35W in Tarrant County, Texas
North Freeway (Houston, Texas), a section of Interstate 45 in Harris County, Texas
North Freeway (Omaha, Nebraska), a section of U.S. Route 75 in Douglas County, Nebraska